The Pen Formation is a Campanian-age geologic unit in the western United States.

Vertebrate fauna
Sharks are well known from the Pen Formation.
 Lonchidion selachos
 Squalicorax kaupi
 Cretorectolobus olsoni
 Ischyrhiza mira
 Scapanorhynchus texanus
 S. raphiodon
 Cretolamna appendiculata

Other fishes include Xiphactinus, the  ray Ptychotrygon, and gar. The nodosaurid ankylosaurs Acantholipan and CPC 273 have also been found in the Pen Formation.

Footnotes

References
 Hunt, ReBecca K., Vincent L. Santucci and Jason Kenworthy. 2006. "A preliminary inventory of fossil fish from National Park Service units." in S.G. Lucas, J.A. Spielmann, P.M. Hester, J.P. Kenworthy, and V.L. Santucci (ed.s), Fossils from Federal Lands. New Mexico Museum of Natural History and Science Bulletin 34, pp. 63–69.

Cretaceous geology of Texas